Georgios Karaiskakis was a Greek revolutionary chieftain of the Macedonian Struggle.

Biography 
Karaiskakis was born in the 1880s in Bogdanci, then Ottoman Empire (now North Macedonia). In 1904 he was ranked in "Macedonian Defense" and took action with his body in the areas of Gevgelija, Bogdanci, Strumica and Polykastro against Bulgarian komitadjis. Particularly in the area of Polykastro he became the fear of the komitadjis, who used that area as their hideout. He collaborated with various Greek armed forces as the chieftain of his own team and after he had exterminated the komitadjis in the lakes of Artzanis - Amatotovos (now dried), he acted in the region of Strumica, where he fought against the Bulgarian komitadjis until the revolution of the Young Turks in 1908. After 1908, new Bulgarian armed groups acted in Strumica who came from Bulgaria, so Karaiskakis rejoined the armed actions.

Death 
Eventually, after 2 years (in 1910), he was killed in the region of Strumica in a battle with an armed group of Bulgarian komitadjis. A bust has been set up to honour him in Evzonoi, Kilkis.

References

Sources
 Παιονία και Παίονες από τα μυθικά χρόνια ως την τουρκοκρατία, Χρήστος Ίντος, Γουμένισσα 1983
 Κέντρα Οργάνωσης, Δράσης και Αντίστασης των Ελλήνων στο Ν. Κιλκίς κατά την περίοδο του Μακεδονικού Αγώνα, Χρήστος Ίντος, Εταιρεία Μακεδονικών Σπουδών, Επιστημονικό Συνέδριο «Μακεδονικός Αγών», 100 χρόνια από το θάνατο του Παύλου Μελά, 12-13 November 2004, Macedonian Library, no. 100, Thessaloniki 2006

1910 deaths
Greek people of the Macedonian Struggle
Greek Macedonians
People from Bogdanci
Macedonian revolutionaries (Greek)
Greek military personnel killed in action